The Matcal Tower is a 17-floor high-rise building at Camp Rabin military base in the HaKirya quarter of Tel Aviv, Israel. It houses the headquarters of the Israel Ministry of Defense and offices of the IDF General Staff (Matcal in Hebrew). It was built in 2003, and is located close to another IDF building, the Marganit Tower, and across the road from the civilian Azrieli Center.

The tower and the Azrieli Bridge connecting the base with the Azrieli Center were designed by Moore Yaski Sivan Architects.

Construction history
The tower was originally planned to include only 14 floors and no helipad.

References

External links

Matcal Tower at Emporis

Skyscrapers in Tel Aviv
Deconstructivism
Futurist architecture
Postmodern architecture
Skyscraper office buildings in Israel

Office buildings completed in 2005
Ministry of Defense (Israel)
2005 establishments in Israel